This is a list of diplomatic missions in Mexico. There are currently 85 embassies in Mexico City, and many countries maintain consulates and/or consulates-general in many Mexican cities (not including honorary consulates).

Diplomatic missions in Mexico

Embassies in Mexico City

Consulates-General in Mexico City

Other missions in Mexico City

Consular missions

Acapulco
 Consular Agency
 Consular Agency

Acayucan
 Consulate General
 Consulate
 Consular Agency

Arriaga
 Consular Office

Cabo San Lucas
 Consular Agency
 Consular Agency

Cancún
 Consular Agency
 Consulate
 Consulate
 Consulate-General
 Consulate General
 Consular Agency

Ciudad Hidalgo
 Consulate

Ciudad Juárez
 Consulate General
 Consulate General

Comitán
 Consulate

Guadalajara
 Consulate
 Consulate
 Consulate General
 Consulate General
 Consulate General

Hermosillo
 Consulate General

León
 Consulate General

Matamoros
 Consulate General

Mazatlán
 Consular Agency
 Consular Agency

Mérida
 Consulate General
 Consulate-General
 Consulate

Monterrey
 Consulate General
 Consulate General
 Consulate
 Consulate General
 Consulate General
 Consulate General
 Consulate General
 Consulate
 Consulate General

Nogales
 Consulate General

Nuevo Laredo
 Consulate General

Oaxaca City
 Consulate General
 Consulate General
 Consular Agency

Piedras Negras
 Consular Agency

Playa del Carmen
 Consulate
 Consular Agency
 Consular Agency

Puebla
 Consulate-General

Puerto Vallarta
 Consular Agency
 Consular Agency

Saltillo
  Consular Agency

San Luis Potosí
 Consulate General
 Consulate General
 Consulate General

San Miguel de Allende
 Consular Agency

Tapachula
 Consulate General
 Consulate General
 Consulate
 Consulate General
 Consulate

Tenosique
 Consulate General
 Consular Agency

Tijuana
 Consular Agency
 Consulate General
 Consulate General
 Consulate General
 Consulate General 
 Consulate General

Tuxtla Gutiérrez
 Consulate General

Veracruz City
 Consulate General
 Consulate General
 Consulate General
 Consulate General

Villahermosa
 Consulate General

Non-resident embassies 
Resident in Washington, D.C. unless otherwise noted:

 (New York City)

 (Ottawa)
 (Nassau)

 (Panama City)

 (New York City)

 (Havana)

 (Havana)
 (New York City)

 (New York City)
 (Valletta)

 (New York City)

 (New York City)

 (Havana)
 (Singapore)

 (Havana)

Former missions

See also 
 Foreign relations of Mexico
 List of diplomatic missions of Mexico
 Visa requirements for Mexican citizens

References

External links 
 Mexican Ministry of Foreign Affairs
 Basque delegation in Mexico City
 Delegation of Quebec in Mexico

Mexico
Diplomatic missions